Bosnia and Herzegovina competed at the 2022 Winter Paralympics in Beijing, China which took place between 4–13 March 2022. Two alpine skiers competed.

Competitors
The following is the list of number of competitors participating at the Games per sport/discipline.

Alpine skiing

Ilma Kazazić and Jovica Goreta competed in alpine skiing.

See also
Bosnia and Herzegovina at the Paralympics
Bosnia and Herzegovina at the 2022 Winter Olympics

References

Nations at the 2022 Winter Paralympics
2022
Winter Paralympics